The Windermere branch line, also called the Lakes line is a branch railway line which runs from Oxenholme on the West Coast Main Line to Windermere via Kendal in the county of Cumbria, North West England.

The line has a loading gauge of W6.

History

The 10 mile (16 km) long line, which opened on 20 April 1847, was originally built as the Kendal and Windermere Railway and at its southern end connected into the Lancaster and Carlisle Railway.  In 1859 it became part of the London and North Western Railway, then the London, Midland and Scottish Railway at the 1923 Grouping.  Upon nationalisation in 1948, it was managed by the London Midland Region of British Railways. On privatisation in 1994, it was initially operated by First North Western, then First TransPennine Express from 2005 and since April 2016 by Northern.

Freight traffic to the last active depot at  had previously ceased in 1972.

There are no passing loops or sidings on the route, which is operated under "One Train Working with Train Staff" regulations, with only one train allowed on the line at any time. Once the train has made its journey to the terminus and back again, the staff must be returned to the cabinet before the train can either leave for the south or make another return trip along the single line.

Due to the lack of a run round loop at the  terminus all services need to be operated by Diesel Multiple Units, or locomotive-hauled trains operating in top and tail mode.

Train services
Passenger services are operated by Northern using Class 185s and more recently by Class 153 and Class 156 diesel multiple units. Previously Class 175 "Coradias" operated the services provided by First North Western and TPE until 2006. Class 158s can also occasionally be seen on the route as a replacement for booked units.

Services over the line are operated by the new Northern franchise, having taken over from First TransPennine Express in April 2016, however, only one service a day continues past Oxenholme to Manchester Airport.

On 4 June 2018 Arriva Rail North announced that all trains on the line would be suspended and replaced by a bus service to allow for driver training. The service suspension was initially to be for 2 weeks until 18 June 2018 but this was later extended until 2 July 2018. However, on 17 June 2018 charter train operator West Coast Railways introduced its own services on the line, which attracted substantially more passengers than the regular  Arriva Rail North services. The reason for this may be that no fares were charged to passengers. The  £5,500 per day reported cost (total approx £80,000 over two weeks of operation) is said to have been paid for by the Department for Transport.

Electrification proposal
In August 2013, the Department for Transport announced that the line was to be electrified as part of the wider scheme to wire many other routes in the North West of England such as the Manchester–Preston line. Funding was approved in 2014 and electrification was planned to be undertaken in CP6, which covers 2019–2024.

However, on 20 July 2017 it was announced that electrification of the Windermere branch had been cancelled. As an alternative, Northern originally planned to utilise  multiple units on the route; these are  electric multiple units converted to function as bi-mode units, which would operate under electric power between Manchester and Oxenholme and then under diesel power on the Windermere branch. However, it was later announced that new Class 331 'Civity' units would be installed with batteries with trials starting from 2021. Platform 3 at Oxenholme Lake District was electrified in 2018 despite the cancelled branch line electrification.

The line in fiction 
The branch line appears in fiction in Arthur Ransome's children's novel Pigeon Post; with two of the children releasing a pigeon at Strickland Junction before they go up the little branch line that led into the hills (and to the Lake).

References

Further reading

 

Rail transport in Cumbria
Railway lines in North West England